Tamakoshi may refer to:

Hiroyuki Tamakoshi, a Japanese manga artist
Tamakoshi, a rural municipality in Nepal
Tamakoshi River, a river in Nepal